Estádio Major José Levy Sobrinho, also known as Limeirão, is a multi-purpose stadium in Limeira, in the Brazilian state of São Paulo. It is currently used mostly for football matches. The stadium has a capacity of 18,000 people. It was built in 1977.

Estádio Major José Levy Sobrinho is owned by the Limeira City Hall. The stadium is named after Major José Levy Sobrinho, who donated the ground plot where the stadium was built. Associação Atlética Internacional usually plays its home matches at the stadium.

History
In 1977, the works on Estádio Major José Levy Sobrinho were completed. The inaugural match was played on January 30 of that year, when Sport Club Corinthians Paulista beat AA Internacional 3–2. The first goal of the stadium was scored by Internacional's Tião Mariano. The stadium's attendance record, 44,000, was also set in the inaugural match.

References

Enciclopédia do Futebol Brasileiro, Volume 2 - Lance, Rio de Janeiro: Aretê Editorial S/A, 2001.

External links
 Templos do Futebol

Major Jose Levy Sobrinho
Major Jose Levy Sobrinho
Major Jose Levy Sobrinho
Limeira